Norman Fitzroy Maclean (December 23, 1902August 2, 1990) was a Scottish-American professor at the University of Chicago who became, following his retirement, a major figure in American literature. Maclean is best known for his collection of novellas A River Runs Through It and Other Stories (1976) and the creative nonfiction book Young Men and Fire (1992).

Family origins
In his novella, A River Runs Through It, Norman Maclean wrote that his paternal ancestors were from the Isle of Mull, in the Inner Hebrides of Scotland. According to his son, however, their paternal ancestors were Gaelic speaking Presbyterians and from the Isle of Coll, which is "located about seven miles west of the Clan MacLean stronghold, the Isle of Mull".

The author's great-grandfather, Laughlan Maclean, was a carpenter by trade and emigrated to Cape Breton, Nova Scotia in 1821, before settling on a homestead in Pictou County. Laughlan Maclean was accompanied by his wife, Elizabeth Campbell.

Norman's father, Rev. John Norman Maclean, was born to Laughlan's son Norman and his wife Mary MacDonald on the family farm in the Canadian Gaelic-speaking community of Marshy Hope, Pictou County, Nova Scotia on July 28, 1862.

Showing signs of academic promise, John Norman Maclean trained for the ministry first at Pictou Academy, where academic records refer to him as "J.N. Mclean of Glenbard", a community famous as the last home and burial place of the Canadian Gaelic poet John MacLean, the former Chief Bard to the Chief of Clan MacLean of Coll, who remains a major figure in Scottish Gaelic literature.

John Maclean completed his education at Dalhousie College in Halifax and at Manitoba College in Winnipeg. While riding circuit in the summers among the many small Presbyterian congregations in the pioneer communities of the Pembina Valley Region of Manitoba, MacLean met his future wife, an English-Canadian schoolmarm named Clara Davidson.

Clara's father, John Davidson, was a Presbyterian immigrant from Northern England, and had settled first near Argenteuil, Laurentides, Quebec, where his daughter Clara had been born. Finding the farmland there to be poor, however, John Davidson and his family had moved west by oxcart and settled on a homestead at New Haven, near Manitou, Manitoba.

During their courtship, Clara often accompanied John while he was riding circuit. In 1893, John Norman Maclean completed advanced studies at San Francisco Theological Seminary in San Anselmo, California and was ordained as a Presbyterian minister. John and Clara Maclean were married in Pembina, Manitoba on August 1, 1893.

Biography

Early life
Norman Maclean was born at Clarinda, Iowa, on December 23, 1902, and was the son of Clara Evelyn (1873–1952) and the Rev. John Norman Maclean (1862–1941). Rev. Maclean homeschooled the young Norman and his brother Paul Davidson MacLean (1906–1938) until 1913. Norman Maclean also grew up with five sisters.

While Maclean was a child in Clarinda, he often witnessed his father working hard to learn diction and elocution and to rid his pronunciation of all signs that Canadian Gaelic, rather than Canadian English, was his first language. It was also in Clarinda that Rev. Maclean first developed a passion for the American sport of fly fishing, which had not previously been practiced by the minister or his forbears in the Inner Hebrides or in Nova Scotia. Rev. Maclean successfully passed on his love of fly fishing to both of his sons.

When asked by an interviewer about having been homeschooled by his father, Maclean recalled, "I think the most important thing is that he read aloud to us. He was a minister, and every morning after breakfast we had what was called family worship. We'd all sit with our breakfast chairs pulled back from the table and he would read to us from the Bible or from some religious poet. He was a very good reader... that was very good for me because in doing that, he would bring out the rhythms of the Bible. That reading instilled in me this great love of rhythm in language."

At the invitation of the elders of the Presbyterian church there, the Maclean family relocated to Missoula, Montana in 1909. The following years considerably influenced and inspired Norman's writings, appearing prominently in the short story The Woods, Books, and Truant Officers (1977) and the semi-autobiographical novella A River Runs Through It and Other Stories (1976).

Forest Service
Maclean was only 14 years old and was too young to enlist in the American Expeditionary Force during World War I, so he instead found work for the United States Forest Service in what is now the Bitterroot National Forest of northwestern Montana. The novella USFS 1919: The Ranger, the Cook, and a Hole in the Sky and the story "Black Ghost" in Young Men and Fire (1992) are semi-fictionalized accounts of these experiences.

Dartmouth

Maclean later attended Dartmouth College, where he served as editor-in-chief of the humor magazine the Dartmouth Jack-O-Lantern; the editor-in-chief to follow him was Theodor Geisel, better known as Dr. Seuss and who, according to Maclean, was “the craziest guy I ever met.” He was also a member of the Sphinx and Beta Theta Pi.

During a 1986 interview, Maclean described the enormous gratitude he felt for having been able to attend creative writing classes taught at Dartmouth by the poet Robert Frost. Maclean stated that he learned an enormous amount from Frost, which he carried with him for the rest of his life. During the same interview, Maclean recalled that his lifelong admiration for and emulation of the writing style of Ernest Hemingway also began during his time at Dartmouth.

Maclean received his Bachelor of Arts in 1924 and chose to remain in Hanover, New Hampshire to serve as an instructor until 1926—a time he recalled in "This Quarter I Am Taking McKeon: A Few Remarks on the Art of Teaching".

Personal life

Jessie Burns first met Norman Maclean during a December party in the Helena valley. They were returning home after the party with another couple in Jessie's car, when a blizzard descended and the car's radiator froze. MacLean tried pouring water in, only to have the water freeze as well. Maclean then started hiking through the blizzard to seek help, but soon found that the car had caught up with him, as the cold had prevented the engine from overheating. Norman felt foolish, but Jessie always considered him the hero of the blizzard.

Maclean and Burns married on September 24, 1931, and had two children: a daughter Jean (born in 1942), now a lawyer, and a son, John Norman Maclean (born in 1943).

Following their marriage, Jessie handled the family's finances and wrote all the checks. Norman also gave up typing and wrote almost everything, including his books, "in a cramped longhand that generations of typists at the University and elsewhere prided themselves on learning to decipher."

Their son, John Maclean, has since written that their family always led two lives. One life was during the summers at the log cabin built by Rev. Maclean near Seeley Lake, Montana. The other life took place in Chicago during the academic year. In fact, on July 26, 1950, the Maclean family was driving between Gillette and Sheridan, Wyoming when they heard over the radio about the outbreak of the Korean War. Stunned, Jessie Maclean said, "We're at war; it should feel different." Outside their family's car, however, "nothing moved but heat waves."

At the University of Chicago, Jessie Maclean's "open personality", made her a lot of friends. It was often said of her in later years, "She was the only one who'd talk to the young faculty wives."

During a 1986 interview, Maclean recalled, "I love Chicago. My wife was very wonderful in helping me come to feel that. I was very provincial in a lot of ways. She was gay and loved life wherever she lived. She really worked me over in our early years in Chicago. I was insolent and provincial about that city. She made me see how beautiful it was, made me see the geometric and industrial and architectural beauty."

The neurologist Dr. Sidney Schulman later said of Jessie Maclean's role at the university, "Jessie knew what was to be said. She said less than she knew, but what she said was enough, and she said it with humor, with literary allusions, and with simplicity. She came to be a sort of housemother. In being this, she was unaware of it - no self-satisfied awareness that what she was doing was noble. She was not playacting. It was part of her existence."

Jessie Maclean died of lung cancer, the result of decades of chain smoking, in 1968.

Their son, John Norman Maclean is now a journalist and author of Fire on the Mountain: The True Story of the South Canyon Fire (1999) and two other books, Fire & Ashes (2003) and The Thirtymile Fire: A Chronicle of Bravery and Betrayal (2007).

Murder of Paul MacLean
After similarly graduating from Dartmouth, Norman's younger brother, Paul Davidson MacLean, became well known as an investigative journalist, who fearlessly exposed political corruption in Helena, Montana linked to the powerful Anaconda Copper Mining Company. Paul Maclean later worked alongside his brother and sister-in-law at the University of Chicago during the Jazz Age and the Depression era. In addition to his talents for both writing and fly fishing, Paul Maclean suffered from alcoholism and gambling addiction, in addition to being a notorious brawler and a womanizer. According to Norman, all of these addictions and behaviors had a very long generational history and could be traced all the way back to the Maclean family's earliest origins among the Gaels of the Inner Hebrides of Scotland. Despite repeated attempts by his family to offer help, Paul MacLean rejected all such overtures.

On the early morning of May 2, 1937, Paul Maclean was attacked and brutally beaten at Sixty-Third Street and Drexel Avenue in Chicago by two men who removed all the money from Maclean's wallet and, according to an eyewitness, drove away afterwards in a car. Paul Maclean was taken to nearby Woodlawn Hospital, where he died, without regaining consciousness, at 1:20PM that same afternoon. According to his brother Norman Maclean and statements made to the press by Detective Sergeant Ignatius Sheehan, Paul Maclean fought back savagely against his assailants and sold his life very dearly. So much so, in fact, that nearly all the bones in his right hand were found by the medical examiner to have been broken during his last fight.

Following a homicide investigation led by Detective Sergeant Ignatius Sheehan, Chicago Police Department Captain Mark Boyle told the Cook County Coroner's Office that Paul Maclean's murder was a mugging gone bad, which remains the official explanation in police files. Another widely held theory at the time was that Paul Maclean's two murderers were linked to organized crime and the murder was over Maclean's inability or refusal to pay an illegal gambling or loansharking debt owed to the Chicago Outfit. No arrests were ever made, however, and the case remains officially unsolved.

Only Norman Maclean accompanied his brother's casket on an overnight train trip from Chicago to Montana. After the funeral, Maclean spent several weeks of compassionate leave with his parents at their family's cabin at Seeley Lake.

Rev. Maclean was understandingly very skeptical of the Chicago Police Department's official explanation for his son's murder. During the compassionate leave, he asked Norman, "Do you think it was just a stick-up and foolishly he tried to fight his way out? You know what I mean -- that it wasn't connected to anything in his past?" Norman replied that the Chicago Police Department didn't know and that neither did he.

Norman Maclean later wrote that their father aged rapidly following Paul's murder and that, "Like many Scottish ministers before him, he had to derive what comfort he could from the faith that his son had died fighting."

A few years later, Rev. Maclean brought up his older son's fondness for writing nonfiction and advised, "After you have finished your true stories sometime, why don't you make up a story and the people to go with it? Only then will you understand what happened and why. It is those we live with and love and should know who elude us."

During visits to the cabin at Seeley Lake in later years, journalist John Norman Maclean would often hear his father calling out over the lake in the evenings, "Paul! Paul!"

University of Chicago
Maclean began graduate studies in English at the University of Chicago in 1928 and earned a PhD in 1940.

Like his contemporary C.S. Lewis, Maclean acquired a reputation for personal magnetism and for making the writings of difficult Medieval authors like François Rabelais and Geoffrey Chaucer come alive in the lecture hall. One of his students later said, "Norman F. Maclean is one of the best liked guys around this place. He is best remembered because when we were freshmen we used to come to class only when he lectured. His classes were always overrun."

According to another of his students, the poet Marie Borroff, Maclean was considered a unique figure at the university because he came from a "wilderness outpost", was a gifted marksman with a rifle, played a rough game of handball, and was every bit as much of an expert on George Armstrong Custer as he was on Aristotle.

During World War II, Maclean declined a commission in the Office of Naval Intelligence to serve as dean of students. During the war, he also served as director of the Institute on Military Studies and co-authored Manual of Instruction in Military Maps and Aerial Photographs.

Maclean eventually became the William Rainey Harper Professor in the Department of English and taught the Romantic poets and Shakespeare. "Every year I said to myself, 'You better teach this bastard so you don't forget what great writing is like.' I taught him technically, two whole weeks for the first scene from Hamlet. I'd spend the first day on just the line, 'Who's there?'"

U.S. Supreme Court Justice John Paul Stevens took a poetry class taught by Maclean at the University of Chicago and later called him, "the teacher to whom I am most indebted."

Maclean also wrote two scholarly articles, "From Action to Image: Theories of the Lyric in the Eighteenth Century" and "Episode, Scene, Speech, and Word: The Madness of Lear", the latter describing a theory of tragedy that he revisited in his later work.

Retirement and Literary Career

After his retirement in 1973, Maclean began, as his children Jean and John had often encouraged him, to write down the stories he liked to tell.

As their father had urged before his death in 1941, Maclean wrote a slightly fictionalized account of his relationship with his brother Paul, beginning with their childhood in Missoula and particularly focusing on their last summer together with their parents before Paul's murder in 1937. The story was included with two other novellas in the collection A River Runs Through It and Other Stories. Another story in the collection described Maclean's employment as a teenager by the United States Forest Service and was titled USFS 1919: The Ranger, the Cook, and a Hole in the Sky. The third novella in the collection was Logging and Pimping and 'Your pal, Jim".

In 1976, A River Runs Through It and Other Stories became the first work of fiction ever published by the University of Chicago Press. The book received enthusiastic reviews, with Publishers Weekly calling it a "stunning debut." It was nominated by a selection committee to receive the Pulitzer Prize in Letters in 1977, but the full committee ignored the nomination and did not award a Pulitzer in that category for the year.

In a May 26, 1976, letter to Nick Lyons, Maclean explained that "Retrievers Good and Bad" had been the first story he attempted after retirement, that it was about his brother, and that he considered it "both a moral and artistic failure." Despite his misgivings about the essay, Maclean published "Retrievers Good and Bad" in Esquire in 1977. That year another essay, "The Woods, Books, and Truant Officers," was published in Chicago magazine. Both essays were anthologized along with a selection of other short writings by Maclean, two interviews, and "essays in appreciation and criticism" in the 1988 volume Norman Maclean. They were collected again in The Norman Maclean Reader (2008).

In a 1986 interview, Maclean expressed contempt for New York City publishers: "Not until recently have the Western writers ever gotten a good break from the publishers in New York." He recalled that A River Runs Through It had been rejected by Alfred A. Knopf and that when Knopf later approached him about his second book, "I really told those bastards off" in a letter that was "probably one of the best things I ever wrote." That 1981 "middle finger of a letter," to Knopf editor Charles Elliott, concludes, "if the situation ever arose when Alfred A. Knopf was the only publishing house remaining in the world and I was the sole surviving author, that would mark the end of the world of books." In that 1986 interview MacLean added, "I had the good fortune of having a dream come true. I'm sure every rejected writer must dream of a time when he's written something that was rejected which turns out to be quite successful, so that all the publishers who rejected him are now coming around and kissing his ass at high noon, and he can tell them where to go."

By the time Maclean published A River Runs through It and Other Stories, he had begun researching a book about the 13 smokejumpers who lost their lives fighting the 1949 Mann Gulch Forest Fire. Maclean's letters, some of them gathered in The Norman Maclean Reader, "attest to his periodic doubts as well as his determination to finish and publish the large manuscript he initially called 'The Great Blow-Up,' and later Young Men and Fire, according to the Reader'''s editor, O. Alan Weltzien. That book was published posthumously in 1992 as Young Men and Fire by the University of Chicago Press and won the National Book Critics Circle Award.

Death
During his last years, Maclean collaborated with several others in attempting to adapt A River Runs Through It into a screenplay. He also struggled to finish Young Men and Fire as his health declined, and because "at the end he lived more for telling and retelling the story — for getting it right — than for publishing it." 
Maclean died in Chicago on August 2, 1990, at the age of 87. He left his manuscript of Young Men and Fire unfinished. At his own request, Maclean's body was cremated and his ashes were scattered over the mountains of Montana.

Legacy

In 1991, a renovated church retirement home was turned into an undergraduate dormitory on the University of Chicago campus named Maclean House. Maclean House's mascot was the "Stormin' Normans" in honor of its namesake. The dorm was closed after the 2015–2016 academic year, subsequently sold, and turned into apartments.

In 2008, the University of Chicago Press published a new compendium of unpublished and some previously published works, The Norman Maclean Reader. The anthology included parts of a never-finished book about George Armstrong Custer and the Battle of the Little Bighorn which Maclean had worked on from 1959 to 1963. Publishers Weekly gave the book a respectful review in the summer of 2008, remarking, "Readers of the two earlier books will find, as Weltzien [Alan Weltzien, the book's editor] phrases it, 'new biographical insights into one of the most remarkable and unexpected careers in American letters.'"

Literary works

Books

1940: The Theory of Lyric Poetry from the Renaissance to Coleridge1943: A Manual of Instruction in Military Maps and Aerial Photographs (with Everett C. Olson)
1976: A River Runs Through It and Other Stories (Illustrated by Barry Moser in 1989)
1992: Young Men and FireArticles and essays

1952: Two essays—(1) "From Action to Image: Theories of the Lyric in the Eighteenth Century" and (2) "Episode, Scene, Speech, and Word: The Madness of Lear" and (2) —in R.S. Crane's Critics and Criticism: Ancient and Modern1956: "Personification But Not Poetry" in ELH: English Literary History Vol. 23, No. 2 (Jun., 1956), pp. 163–170.

Edited works

1988: Norman Maclean (edited by Ron McFarland and Hugh Nichols)
2008: The Norman Maclean Reader (edited by O. Alan Weltzien)

In popular culture
In 1992, Maclean's novella A River Runs Through It was adapted into a motion picture directed by Robert Redford and released by Columbia Pictures, starring Craig Sheffer as Norman Maclean, Brad Pitt as Paul Davidson Maclean, Brenda Blethyn as Clara Davidson Maclean, Emily Lloyd as Jessie Burns, and Tom Skerritt as Rev. John Norman Maclean
Maclean's other novella from the same collection, USFS 1919: The Ranger, the Cook, and a Hole in the Sky was adapted into a 1995 ABC television film titled The Ranger, the Cook and a Hole in the Sky, also known simply as Hole in the Sky''. The film was directed by John Kent Harrison, with the adaptation written by Robert Wayne, and stars Sam Elliott, Jerry O'Connell, Ricky Jay, and Molly Parker. It was filmed in British Columbia, Canada.

References

External links

Norman Maclean Home Page
Excerpt from A River Runs Through It
Excerpt from Young Men and Fire

Guide to the Norman Maclean Papers 1880-1990 at the University of Chicago Special Collections Research Center

1902 births
1990 deaths
20th-century American male writers
20th-century American non-fiction writers
20th-century American novelists
20th-century American short story writers
20th-century Presbyterians
American male novelists
American male short story writers
American people of Canadian descent
American people of Scottish descent
American Presbyterians
Angling writers
Calvinist and Reformed writers
Clan Maclean
Dartmouth College alumni
Novelists from Iowa
Novelists from Illinois
People from Clarinda, Iowa
Presbyterian writers
Scottish-American culture
University of Chicago faculty
Writers from Chicago
Writers from Missoula, Montana